The 1994 German Grand Prix was a Formula One motor race held on 31 July 1994 at the Hockenheimring, Hockenheim. It was the ninth race of the 1994 Formula One World Championship.

The 45-lap race was won from pole position by Austrian driver Gerhard Berger, driving a Ferrari. Berger achieved the first victory for the Ferrari team since the 1990 Spanish Grand Prix, some 59 races previously. In a race of high attrition, including eleven retirements on the opening lap, only eight cars finished, with French drivers Olivier Panis and Éric Bernard second and third respectively in their Ligier-Renaults.

Report
The fast Hockenheim circuit had been modified from the year before, with the fast Senna chicane being made slower.

The Ferraris qualified first and second, with Gerhard Berger in pole position and Jean Alesi lining up alongside. The race was notable for its high rate of attrition, with 11 retirements on the opening lap. Within ten seconds of the start Alessandro Zanardi and Andrea de Cesaris tangled towards the back of the pack, taking out both Michele Alboreto and Pierluigi Martini before even reaching the first corner. Mika Häkkinen and David Coulthard then tangled going into the first corner, the Finn sliding in front of a group of cars into the wall on the outside of the circuit while the Scot continued to the pits to replace his front wing.

Mark Blundell braked hard to avoid the McLaren only to be hit from behind by Eddie Irvine, while Rubens Barrichello and Heinz-Harald Frentzen had nowhere to go but the gravel. Barrichello retired on the spot, but Frentzen stopped towards the end of the lap with broken suspension and a punctured tyre. In the melee behind this incident, Johnny Herbert and Martin Brundle tangled, the McLaren spinning out and the Lotus retiring later on in the lap with a broken front suspension. Damon Hill also damaged his suspension in a first-lap contact with Ukyo Katayama and, along with a very long pitstop, circulated outside the points for the remainder of the race. This result would have significant consequences for Hill at the end of the season. 

Meanwhile Jean Alesi had gotten away unscathed, having qualified second, only for his Ferrari to stop with electrical problems on the run to the first chicane. It was a bad weekend for the Benetton team. After the first lap mayhem, Schumacher went on to take on the leading Ferrari of Gerhard Berger but fell away with engine problems very quickly. Benetton driver Jos Verstappen also came into the pits; while refuelling, some fuel was accidentally sprayed onto the hot bodywork of the car, and a few seconds later the fuel ignited and Verstappen's car was engulfed in a ball of flames. The Dutchman escaped the incident with burns around his eyes, as he had his visor up during the pit stop. No other crew members or any persons were injured severely. As well as Ferrari winning its first and only race of the 1994 Formula One season, the race was especially good for Ligier with Olivier Panis finishing second and Éric Bernard coming home third.

Classification

Qualifying

Race

Championship standings after the race

Drivers' Championship standings

Constructors' Championship standings

References

External links

German Grand Prix
German Grand Prix
Grand Prix
German Grand Prix